Scolytoplatypus is a genus of beetles belonging to the family Curculionidae. The genus contains about 47 to 50 species worldwide. In Asia, 29 species known, 11 or 12 are known in African continent and 7 species in Madagascar.

Males and females are strongly dimorphic. Male frons distinctly concave as opposed to the convex female frons. Asian species can be easily separated from African counterparts by having sexually dimorphic antennae.

Species
 Scolytoplatypus acuminatus
 Scolytoplatypus africanus
 Scolytoplatypus armatus
 Scolytoplatypus blandfordi
 Scolytoplatypus brahma
 Scolytoplatypus calvus
 Scolytoplatypus cirratus
 Scolytoplatypus congonus
 Scolytoplatypus curviciliosus
 Scolytoplatypus eichelbaumi
 Scolytoplatypus exiguus
 Scolytoplatypus daimio
 Scolytoplatypus darjeelingi
 Scolytoplatypus fasciatus
 Scolytoplatypus gardneri
 Scolytoplatypus hova
 Scolytoplatypus kivuensis
 Scolytoplatypus kunala
 Scolytoplatypus lopchuensis
 Scolytoplatypus luzonicus
 Scolytoplatypus macgregori
 Scolytoplatypus mikado
 Scolytoplatypus minimus
 Scolytoplatypus mutabilis
 Scolytoplatypus neglectus
 Scolytoplatypus nitidicollis
 Scolytoplatypus obtectus
 Scolytoplatypus occidentalis
 Scolytoplatypus opacicollis
 Scolytoplatypus permirus
 Scolytoplatypus pubescens
 Scolytoplatypus raja
 Scolytoplatypus ruficauda
 Scolytoplatypus rugosus
 Scolytoplatypus samsinghensis
 Scolytoplatypus shogun
 Scolytoplatypus supercilliosus
 Scolytoplatypus truncatus
 Scolytoplatypus unipilus
 Scolytoplatypus uter
 Scolytoplatypus zahradniki

References

Beetles of Asia
Beetles of Africa
Curculionidae